Three of a Kind (also released as Three Wise Crooks) is a 1925 American silent crime film directed by F. Harmon Weight and starring Evelyn Brent. The film is considered to be lost.

Plot
As described in a film magazine review, Molly Duvans, who works with Dan Pelton and Spug Casey, robs a diamond merchant and makes her getaway through a cleverly contrived fake involving a dental office. In a park she meets Ma Dickenson, nervous and distrait, and at first suspects her of some kind of crookedness. But Ma is genuine. She has lost her purse and her ticket to her home in Greenville. Molly gets her a ticket and sends her home. When the detectives get too warm on the trail of the trio of crooks, Molly goes to Greenville on the invitation of Ma Dickenson, extended to her on the occasion of their first meeting. The old lady and Betsy Ann Morgan do everything possible to make the visitor happy. Molly learns of a plot formed by the town banker and an oil promoter to swindle the townspeople. She sends for her pals to rob the bank. Then she learns that her hostess has sunk all her money in the deal and she has a change of heart. When the men arrive, Spug falls in love with Betsy Ann. Dan is for going ahead with the robbery. He hides in the bank. The banker and his partner in crime enter to get the money. But Molly and Spug have taken it, intending to return the funds to its rightful owners. Spug picks up enough evidence to clear Molly when she is suspected of the robbery. The three crooks go straight thereafter.

Cast

References

External links

1925 films
1925 crime films
1925 lost films
American crime films
American silent feature films
American black-and-white films
Film Booking Offices of America films
Lost American films
Lost crime films
1920s American films